Royal Air Force Waddington otherwise known as RAF Waddington  is a Royal Air Force (RAF) station located beside the village of Waddington,  south of Lincoln, Lincolnshire, in England.

The station is the RAF's Intelligence Surveillance Target Acquisition and Reconnaissance (ISTAR) hub and is home to a fleet of aircraft composed of the Shadow R1, RC-135W Rivet Joint and operating base for the RAF's MQ-9 Reaper. Since October 2022, it has also been home to the RAF's Aerobatic Team the Red Arrows.

History

First World War

RAF Waddington opened as a Royal Flying Corps flying training station in 1916. Student pilots, including members of the US Army, were taught to fly a variety of aircraft. The station came under the control of the Royal Air Force when it was created on 1 April 1918. It operated until 1920, when the station went into care and maintenance.

During and after the First World War, the following squadrons operated from Waddington.
 No. 82 Squadron RFC between 30 March 1917 and 17 November 1917, using the Armstrong Whitworth F.K.8, before moving to Saint-Omer in France.
 No. 97 Squadron RFC between 1 December 1917 and 21 January 1918, with no aircraft before moving to Stonehenge, in Wiltshire.
 No. 105 Squadron RFC formed at the airfield on 23 September 1917, flying various aircraft and stayed until 3 October 1917 when it moved to Andover in Hampshire.
 No. 117 Squadron RFC formed at Waddington on 1 January 1918, flying various aircraft and stayed until 3 April 1918 when the squadron moved to Hucknall in Nottinghamshire.
 No. 123 Squadron RFC formed at the airfield on 1 February 1918 and flew various aircraft before moving to Duxford in Cambridgeshire on 1 March 1918.
 No. 23 Squadron RAF between 15 March 1919 and 31 December 1919 with no aircraft before being disbanded.
 No. 203 Squadron RAF between 27 March 1919 and December 1919 with no aircraft as a cadre before moving to RAF Scopwick, also in Lincolnshire.
 No. 204 Squadron RAF from 11 February 1919 as a cadre with no aircraft until 31 December 1919 when the squadron disbanded.

Interwar period
As part of the pre-war expansion programme the Waddington site was earmarked for development into a fully equipped bomber station. It reopened as a bomber base on 12 March 1937, with No. 50 Squadron arriving on the same day with their Hawker Hinds and then adding the Handley Page Hampden. No. 110 Squadron arrived 15 days later initially with the Hind before switching to the Bristol Blenheim. On 7 June 1937 No. 88 Squadron reformed at Waddington with the Hind before moving to RAF Boscombe Down in Wiltshire on 17 July 1937. On 16 June 1937 No. 44 Squadron moved in from RAF Andover flying the Blenheim, before switching to the Avro Anson and the Hampden in February 1939. In May 1939 No. 110 Squadron left going to RAF Wattisham in Suffolk and No. 50 Squadron left the following year being moved to RAF Lindholme in South Yorkshire.

Second World War

RAF Waddington began the Second World War housing the Hampdens of No. 44 Squadron and No. 50 Squadron. Both squadrons were in action on the same day as Britain's war declaration, attacking German naval targets at Kiel. Waddington squadrons were also involved during the critical stages of the late summer and early autumn of 1940, attacking barges in the channel ports which were being assembled as part of the invasion fleet.

In November 1940 it was the first station to receive the Avro Manchester heavy bomber.

No. 44 Squadron RAF was the first in RAF Bomber Command to fly operationally with the Avro Lancaster on 2 March 1942 from Waddington. BT308, the first prototype Lancaster (or Mk III Manchester), arrived at Waddington in September 1941 for flight tests. Similar to RAF Scampton, the station was part of 5 Group.

On 17 April 1942, seven Lancasters of No. 44 Squadron took off from Waddington as part of Operation Margin, a bombing raid on the MAN U-boat engine plant in Augsburg in Germany. The squadron subsequently left Waddington on 31 May 1943, moving to RAF Dunholme Lodge, also in Lincolnshire.

During the Second World War the following squadrons are known to have operated from Waddington.
 No. 97 Squadron reformed on 25 February 1941, with the Avro Manchester before moving to nearby RAF Coningsby on 10 March 1941.
 No. 9 Squadron arrived on 7 August 1942, initially with the Vickers Wellington III, before switching to the Lancaster I and III during September 1942. The squadron moved to RAF Bardney, also in Lincolnshire, on 14 April 1943.

No. 142 Squadronn was present between 15 June 1940 and 3 July 1940 with the Fairey Battle before moving to RAF Binbrook, also in Lincolnshire.
 No. 207 Squadron reformed at Waddington on 1 November 1940 with the Manchester adding the Hampden for a month in July 41. The squadron moved to RAF Bottesford on 17 November 1941
 No. 420 Squadron of the Royal Canadian Air Force (RCAF) formed on 19 December 1941 with the Hampden before moving to RAF Skipton-on-Swale in North Yorkshire on 7 August 1942.
 No. 463 Squadron of the Royal Australian Air Force (RAAF) formed at the airfield on 25 November 1943 with the Lancaster I and III before moving to RAF Skellingthorpe in Lincoln on 3 July 1945.
 No. 467 Sqn RAAF was present between 13 November 1943 and 15 June 1945 with the Lancaster Mks I and III. The squadron then moved to nearby RAF Metheringham.
 No. 617 Squadron was present between 17 June 1945 and 19 January 1946 with the Lancaster VII-FE before moving to RAF Digri in Pakistan.

Cold War
During the Cold War, RAF Waddington became an Avro Vulcan V-bomber station, with No. 83 Squadron being the first in the RAF to receive the Vulcan in May 1957. It continued in this role until 1984 when the last Vulcan squadron, No. 50 Squadron, disbanded. From 1968, the UK nuclear deterrent was transferred to Polaris submarines, beginning with HMS Resolution.

In August 1960, the station developed the sudsmobile technique to lay a  carpet of foam in around a half-hour for a wheels-up landing. Previously it had taken around three hours to lay a foam carpet on the runway. An English Electric Canberra from RAF Wyton landed wheels-up on 23 August 1960, with a Handley Page Victor managing the same on 5 December 1960.

The fiftieth anniversary of the RAF was celebrated at the base on 1 April 1968, mainly because the RAF's last flying Lancaster was based at the airfield from the mid-1960s until 1970, when moved temporarily to Hendon.

During the Cold War the following squadrons are known to have operated from Waddington.

 No. 9 Squadron operating the Avro Vulcan B.2 between 1975 and April 1982 when they were disbanded, later reforming at RAF Honington in Suffolk as the first operational Panavia Tornado GR1 squadron.
 No. 12 Squadron between 26 July 1946 and 18 September 1946 initially with the Lancaster I and III before swapping to the Avro Lincoln B.2 and moving to RAF Binbrook.
 No. 21 Squadron and No. 27 Squadron, which were both present from 26 May 1955 until 31 December 1957 with the English Electric Canberra B.2 before being disbanded.
 No. 44 Squadron between 10 August 1960 and 21 December 1982 when they were disbanded. The squadron operated the Avro Vulcan B.1 and B.2.
 No. 50 Squadron were based at Waddington from 26 January 1946 with the Lincoln B.2 before being disbanded on 31 January 1951. It reformed at the airfield on 1 August 1962 and operated the Vulcan B.1, B.2 and B.2K before being disbanded on 31 March 1984.
 No. 57 Squadron between 7 October 1946 and 4 April 1951 with the Lincoln B.2 before moving to RAF Marham in Norfolk, the squadron returned on 4 June 1951 with the Washington B.1 before leaving again on 2 April 1952 to RAF Coningsby.
 No. 61 Squadron starting from 25 January 1946 with the Lancaster I and III before being replaced by the Lincoln B.2. The squadron left on 6 August 1953 moving to RAF Wittering in Cambridgeshire.
 No. 83 Squadron from 21 March 1957 with the Vulcan B.1 before being reduced to a cadre with no aircraft and moving to RAF Scampton on 10 August 1960.
 No. 101 Squadron from 26 June 1961 with the Vulcan B.1 and B.2 before being disbanded on 4 August 1982.

RAF Waddington was home to several USAF Coronet deployments throughout the Cold War:
 Coronet Stallion from 21 August to 12 September 1979 saw the deployment of 18 LTV A-7D Corsair IIs from the 124th TFS (Iowa ANG), 174th TFS (South Dakota ANG) and 175th TFS (Iowa ANG).
 Coronet Buffalo from 11 May to 8 June 1985 saw the deployment of 33 A-7D Corsair IIs and 3 A-7Ks from the 124th TFS (Iowa ANG), 174th TFS (South Dakota ANG) and 175th TFS (Iowa ANG).
 Coronet East 97 from 3 to 15 June 1991 saw the deployment of 12 A-7D Corsair IIs from the 125th Tactical Fighter Squadron (Ohio ANG).

Falklands War

During the Falklands War, Operation Black Buck saw three aircraft and crews from Waddington take part in a long-range bombing raid on Port Stanley airfield in the Falkland Islands. The three Vulcan B2s, of No. 44 Squadron, No. 50 Squadron and No. 101 Squadron, were twenty-two years old, and were selected because they had the more powerful Olympus 301 engines. A complicated air-to-air refuelling plan, involving fourteen Handley Page Victor K.2 tankers, was developed. Navigation came from the Delco Carousel inertial navigation system.

1990s
In July 1991 No. 8 Squadron moved to RAF Waddington and re-equipped with Boeing E-3 Sentrys.In 1993, the only RAF Avro Vulcan bomber maintained by RAF Waddington for flying displays, XH558, was retired due to budget restraints to Bruntingthorpe Aerodrome, Leicestershire.

The Electronic Warfare Operational Support Element (EWOSE – now known as the Air Warfare Centre) moved from RAF Wyton to Waddington in March 1995.

In 1998 26 Squadron RAF Regiment moved to RAF Waddington from RAF Laarbruch in Germany.  The squadron was equipped with the Rapier Field standard C short range air defence missile system, and remained at Waddington until its temporary disbandment in 2008.

21st century 

All of the aircraft operating squadrons based at RAF Waddington were dispersed to other airfields in July 2014 when the runway was closed for rebuilding. The project, valued at £35 million and due to take 12 months, actually took 26 months and re-opened to aircraft officially in November 2016. The work was expected to increase the operational capability of the runway and airfield by 25 years.

No. 216 Squadron reformed at Waddington on 1 April 2020 as an experimental unit testing future drone swarm technology.

In September 2020, work to convert a hangar into a joint flight simulator training facility was completed. The facility, operated by the Air Battlespace Training Centre, allows simulators at different locations to be linked together, enabling UK and US crews to train with one another in scenarios which would be difficult to recreate in real life.

No. 5 (Army Co-operation) Squadron was disbanded in March 2021 when the Sentinel R1 was withdrawn from service.

In August 2022, No. 39 Squadron disbanded, with a MQ-9A Reaper Ground Control System returning from Creech AFB in Nevada to Waddington for use by No. 13 Squadron, which continued to operate the Reaper.

During early October 2022, the RAF Aerobatic Team the Red Arrows and its 146 personnel relocated to Waddington from its previous home at RAF Scampton which is set to close.

Role and operations

Command 
Group Captain Mark Lorriman-Hughes was appointed as the Station Commander in January 2022.

ISTAR operations

RAF Waddington is the RAF's Intelligence Surveillance Target Acquisition and Reconnaissance (ISTAR) hub and is home to a fleet of aircraft composed of the Sentry AEW1, Shadow R1, and RC-135W Rivet Joint, and is an operating base for the RAF's MQ-9 Reaper.

No. 1 Intelligence Surveillance Reconnaissance Wing formed on 1 April 2016. It is a mix of the staff and capabilities of the Tactical Imagery Intelligence Wing (TIW) at RAF Marham, No. 54 Signals Unit at RAF Digby and No. 5 (AC) Squadron. Waddington is home to the wing headquarters.

Expeditionary Air Wing
No. 34 Expeditionary Air Wing (EAW) was formed at Waddington on 1 April 2006 to create a deployable air force structure.

Supported units
The Lincolnshire & Nottinghamshire Air Ambulance, flying an AgustaWestland AW169 (previously an MD-902 Explorer), began operating from the station in 1994 and provides a helicopter emergency medical service throughout Lincolnshire and Nottinghamshire.

RAF Waddington Voluntary Band is one of seven voluntary bands within the RAF.

Amateur radio licensees are not allowed to operate unattended radio beacon transmitters on 28.000–29.700 MHz, 10.000–10.125 GHz, 24.000–24.050 GHz, or 47.000–47.200 GHz within 50 km of the Waddington airfield, centred on Ordnance Survey Grid Reference SK 985640.

Based units 
The following notable flying and non-flying units are based at RAF Waddington:

Royal Air Force 
No. 1 Group (Air Combat) RAF

Intelligence, Surveillance, Target Acquisition and Reconnaissance (ISTAR) Air Wing
ISTAR Air Wing Headquarters
ISTAR Engineering Wing
ISTAR Support Wing
 No. 1 Intelligence, Surveillance and Reconnaissance (ISR) Wing
 No. 1 ISR Wing Headquarters
 No. 2 ISR Squadron
ISR Support Squadron
No. 8 Squadron – formerly Sentry AEW1
No. 13 Squadron – MQ-9A Reaper
No. 14 Squadron – Shadow R1
No. 51 Squadron – RC-135W Rivet Joint
No. 54 Squadron – ISTAR Force Operational Conversion Unit (OCU)
No. 54 Signals Unit
RAF Aerobatic Team (The Red Arrows) – BAE Hawk T1A

No. 2 Group (Air Combat Support) RAF

Intelligence Reserve Wing
No. 616 (South Yorkshire) Squadron (Royal Auxiliary Air Force)
 No. 7006 (VR) Intelligence Squadron (Royal Auxiliary Air Force)
No. 7010 (VR) Photographic Interpretation Squadron (Royal Auxiliary Air Force)
No. 7630 (VR) Intelligence Squadron (Royal Auxiliary Air Force)
No. 2 RAF Police & Security Wing
No. 2 RAF Police & Security Wing Headquarters
No. 5 RAF Police (ISTAR) Squadron Headquarters
No. 2503 (County of Lincoln) Squadron (Royal Auxiliary Air Force) Regiment
Defence Warning and Reporting Flight

RAF Air and Space Warfare Centre

Air and Space Warfare Centre Headquarters
No. 56 Squadron – ISTAR Operational Evaluation Unit (OEU)
No. 92 Tactics and Training Squadron
Air Battlespace Training Centre (ABTC)
Joint Electronic Warfare Operational Support Centre

Other RAF Units

 No. 216 Squadron – drone swarm technology testing
Mobile Meterological Unit
RAF Waddington Voluntary Band

The deployable elements of the station structure form the core of No. 34 Expeditionary Air Wing.

British Army 
Royal Engineers 

 8 Engineer Brigade
 170 (Infrastructure Support) Engineer Group
 20 Works Group (Air Support)
531 Specialist Team Royal Engineers (Airfields) (STRE)

Civilian 

 RAF Waddington Flying Club - Cessna 152, Cessna 172 and PA-28.

Future

Protector RG1 

The General Atomics MQ-9B, a remotely piloted air system (RPAS), which will be known as the Protector RG1 in RAF service, will be based at RAF Waddington. The first squadron to operate the Protector is expected to be No. 31 Squadron. A new hangar, support facilities and crew accommodation will be constructed at Waddington at a cost of £93 million.

No. 8 Squadron 
In December 2020, the RAF announced that its new fleet of Boeing E-7 Wedgetail AEW1 aircraft are to be based at RAF Lossiemouth in Moray from 2023. The Airborne early warning and control aircraft will replace Waddington's E-3D Sentry AEW1 fleet. No. 8 Squadron will relocate to Lossiemouth to operate the new aircraft.

Heritage

Station badge and motto 
The station badge depicts Lincoln Cathedral rising through the clouds, with the motto 'For Faith and Freedom' emblazoned below.

Gate guardians 
The gate guardian at RAF Waddington is Avro Vulcan XM607, one of three Vulcan bombers (XM597, XM598, XM607) which took part in Operation Black Buck raids between April and June 1982 during the Falklands War. XM607 was stationed at Waddington and took part in the raids, captained by pilots Flight Lieutenant Martin Withers (on mission 1 and 7) and by Squadron Leader John Reeve (on mission 2). In 1984, along with all other remaining Vulcans, XM607 was retired from active service, and was preserved as the gate guardian at Waddington.

A Hawker Hunter F.6A acts as gate guardian outside the No. 8 Squadron facilities at Waddington. Styled as 'XE620' in No. 8 Squadron markings, the aircraft was originally XE606.

List of Station Commanders

Previous units
The following units were also stationed at Waddington at some point:

Waddington International Air Show

The first RAF Waddington International Air Show was staged at RAF Waddington in 1995, after the event was moved down from RAF Finningley - an RAF station located east of Doncaster (now Robin Hood Airport Doncaster Sheffield) which was closed down in 1995. Over the following years the RAF Waddington International Air Show developed into the largest of all Royal Air Force air shows. It took place on the first weekend in July, attracting over 140,000 visitors and representatives of Air Forces from all round the world.  The main purpose of the show was to raise public awareness and understanding of the RAF and its role today. Eighty five percent (85%) of all proceeds from the event were distributed to the two main Service charities; the RAF Benevolent Fund and the RAF Association; the remaining 15% donated to local worthy causes. Since the inaugural year 1995 the Air Show has raised almost £3 million for Service and local charities.

In 2015 the station was earmarked for development, a significant part of which being concerned with the station's runway with work scheduled for 59 weeks. This therefore ruled out an airshow during 2015. The timing of the works coincided with a review of the station in general, the continuance of the airshow being also part of the review. The outcome was that having weighed up the content of the report, it was decided that: "significant security risks as well as certain operational risks" resulted from the operation of the RAF Waddington Airshow, and therefore the airshow, for the reasons cited, would not be continued with. These security risks have generally centred on RAF Waddington being used as a base for the operation of Reaper drones.

In February 2016 it was announced that following an agreement between the Royal Air Force and the Royal Air Force Charitable Trust, the venue of the airshow would switch from RAF Waddington to RAF Scampton, with the hope that the airshow would be resurrected in 2017.

See also
 List of Royal Air Force stations
List of V Bomber dispersal bases

References

Citations

Bibliography

External links

 
Insight – RAF Waddington station magazine
 RAF Waddington Defence Aerodrome Manual
 RAF Waddington Pipes and Drums
UK Military Aeronautical Information Publication – Waddington (EGXW)

Airports in England
Airshows in the United Kingdom
Military units and formations established in 1937
North Kesteven District
Royal Air Force stations in Lincolnshire
Royal Air Force stations of World War II in the United Kingdom
Y service